is a 2017 Japanese animated fantasy film produced by Science Saru and released by Toho about the eponymous ningyo. It was directed by Masaaki Yuasa, and written by Yuasa and Reiko Yoshida. The music was composed by Takatsugu Muramatsu. It is the second Science Saru film, though it was the first to be produced.

The film was released in Japan on May 19, 2017, It was also released by Anime Limited on December 6, 2017, and by GKIDS on May 11, 2018. Half Symbolic Films released the film on January 31, 2019.

Plot

One day, Kai explores  and meets , the ningyo girl. The music beat allows her fish fin to transform into a pair of human legs. The two strike up a friendship, and Kai takes Lu around the town for a tour. Kai learns that Lu cannot touch sunlight or she will burst into flames. He also learned that Lu has a papa and her mother was killed by a ship. Kai introduces Lu to Yuho and Kuino. When Kai accidentally reveals the secret of the merfolk to the townspeople, Lu's love and power of music makes them dance around town. Despite Kai's selfishness, videos of Lu go viral and she becomes a celebrity. Inspired by her popularity, Yūho's grandfather reopens an old merfolk-themed amusement park on an island near the town. Kai becomes disinterested in the band and begins to ignore Lu. SEIRÈN plays the park's opening, but after Lu arrives and steals the show, Yūho becomes upset and runs away.

Meanwhile, anti-merfolk feelings have been rising in the town, and when Yūho cannot be found by her father, he puts the blame on Lu and captures her. As he threatens her with sunlight, Lu's father comes to save her, which triggers a curse that begins to flood the town. Kai and Yūho help Lu and her father escape, who in turn rally other merfolk to help the town escape the rising waters. In the process of helping, the merfolk destroy the natural cliff which shades the bay from the sun, exposing themselves as the dawn breaks. As the threat of the curse disperses, the townspeople gather themselves and use many umbrellas to save all sea creatures from the sun.

Kai apologizes to Lu and everyone dances happily until all sea creatures return to the ocean. Kai starts a new life in town.

Voice cast

Production
Yuasa announced on his Twitter that he was working on the film in January 2017. It was animated in a hybrid form in which key frames were drawn on paper, but instead of the traditional clean-up and inbetweening still used in most Japanese traditional animation at the time, these rough key frames were then traced and inbetweened in Adobe Flash.

Yuasa acknowledged that Lu shares some similar plot elements and the visual subject of water with Hayao Miyazaki's film Ponyo, and that it occurred to him late into the production of Lu. He considers this due to the influence on him of Miyazaki and Isao Takahata's Panda! Go, Panda!: Rainy-day Circus, which Miyazaki reused elements of himself in Ponyo, and is happy for his works to include such homages to works he admires.

Kazuyoshi Saito's 1997 song  was chosen to be the theme song of the film.

Reception

Critical reception
On review aggregator Rotten Tomatoes, the film holds a 78% approval rating based on 45 reviews, with an average rating of 6.4/10. The website's critics consensus reads, "Lu Over the Wall can be more fun to watch than to follow, but director Masaaki Yuasa's distinctive visual style offers colorful compensation for an occasionally scattered story." Metacritic, which uses a weighted average, assigned the film a score of 62 out of 100 based on 14 critics, indicating "generally favorable reviews".

Charles Solomon from Los Angeles Times wrote, "Yuasa's bold imagery and sometimes convoluted storytelling defy the conventions of traditional animated filmmaking, but he is clearly an artist with an individual vision whose work offers something genuinely new and eye-catching."

On the other hand, Simon Abrams from RogerEbert.com said "Still, I can't lie: I was bored throughout the 112 minutes I spent watching Lu over the Wall. I initially thought that I was allergic to the mediocre English voice actors' performances. But I soon realized that that my biggest problem was that I couldn't reconcile the basic disconnect between the thrilling story-telling and the paint-by-numbers story. I wanted the film's creators to do something with their formulaic narrative, but they never did."

Box office
Lu over the Wall grossed $161,253 at the box office.

Accolades

References

External links
  
  
  
 
 
 

2010s disaster films
2017 fantasy films
2010s supernatural films
2010s teen fantasy films
2017 anime films
Annecy Cristal for a Feature Film winners
Dance in anime and manga
Electronic music films
Films about mermaids
Films based on Japanese myths and legends
Films set in Japan
Flash animated films
Flood films
Japanese animated fantasy films
Japanese disaster films
Japanese mythology in anime and manga
Japanese rock music films
Japanese supernatural films
Japanese teen films
2010s Japanese-language films
Music in anime and manga
Noitamina
Science Saru
Supernatural anime and manga
Toho animated films
Yōkai in anime and manga